Chrysoritis daphne, the Daphne's opal, is a species of butterfly in the family Lycaenidae. It is endemic to South Africa, where it is found on the southern slopes of the Kammanassie Mountains in the Western Cape.

The wingspan is 25–29 mm for males and 29–31 mm for females. Adults are on wing from November to February. There is one extended generation per year.

The larvae feed on Thesium species. They are attended by Crematogaster liengmei ants.

References

Butterflies described in 1975
Chrysoritis
Endemic butterflies of South Africa
Taxonomy articles created by Polbot